Robert Lee Wolff (26 December 1915, New York City – 11 November 1980, Cambridge, Massachusetts) was a Harvard history professor, known for his 1956 book The Balkans in our time and his library collection of English novels of the Victorian period with over 18,000 items.

Wolff received his bachelor's degree (1936) and his master's degree from Harvard University, where he was a teaching fellow from 1937 to 1941, when he left Harvard to join the Office of Strategic Services (O.S.S.). As a leading expert on the Balkans, he was assistant to the director of the Balkans section of the O.S.S. After the end of World War II, Wolff taught for four years at the University of Wisconsin–Madison, and then in 1950 became an associate professor in the Harvard history department. He became a full professor in 1955 and served as the chair of the department from 1960 to 1963. Wolff was elected to the American Academy of Arts and Sciences in 1954 and the American Philosophical Society in 1963. In 1963–1964 Wolff was a Guggenheim fellow. He died of a heart attack in 1980 at the age of 64, while still an active member of the Harvard history department.

Wolff wrote articles, prefaces, and books on history and English literature and was the co-author of three widely used textbooks in high school and undergraduate history courses. His library of English novels of the Victorian period was acquired in the 1980s by the University of Texas at Austin for $2.6 million.

Works
 with Crane Brinton and John B. Christopher: (textbook; 2nd edn. 1960; 3rd edn. 1967; 4th edn. 1971; 5th edn. 1976)
  (revised edn. 1974; reprinted in 1978)
 with Crane Brinton and John B. Christopher:  (textbook; 2nd edn. 1967; 3rd edn. 1973))
 
 with Crane Brinton and John B. Christopher:  (textbook: 2nd edn. 1969; 3rd edn. 1973; 4th edn. 1981)

References

1915 births
1980 deaths
American book and manuscript collectors
American bibliographers
American medievalists
Harvard University alumni
Harvard University faculty
Historians of the Balkans
20th-century American historians
American male non-fiction writers
People from New York City
Historians from New York (state)
University of Wisconsin–Madison faculty
People of the Office of Strategic Services
20th-century American male writers
Members of the American Philosophical Society